Luboszów  is an unincorporated village in the administrative district of Gmina Osiecznica, within Bolesławiec County, Lower Silesian Voivodeship, in south-western Poland.

It is the one of the smallest villages in Poland with only one household and two people registered. Polana, Gmina Czersk, Pomeranian Voivodeship has just 1 person, although it is a part of Pustki.

References

Villages in Bolesławiec County